Fitzroy was an electoral district of the Legislative Assembly in the Australian state of Queensland.

The district was based in central Queensland, west of Rockhampton. It included the towns of Baralaba, Blackwater, Duaringa, Dysart, Mount Morgan and Wowan as well as some of Rockhampton's outer suburbs. The electorate was first contested in 1992. An earlier district based in the same region was also called Fitzroy. It was first contested in 1888 and abolished in 1960.

In 2008, Fitzroy was abolished—with effect at the 2009 state election—as a result of a redistribution undertaken by the Electoral Commission of Queensland. Its former territory and voters were divided between the districts of Callide, Gregory, Mirani and Rockhampton.

Members for Fitzroy

Election results

See also
 Electoral districts of Queensland
 Members of the Queensland Legislative Assembly by year
 :Category:Members of the Queensland Legislative Assembly by name

References

External links
 ABC profile

Former electoral districts of Queensland
Constituencies established in 1888
Constituencies established in 1992
1888 establishments in Australia
1992 establishments in Australia
Constituencies disestablished in 1960
Constituencies disestablished in 2009
1960 disestablishments in Australia
2009 disestablishments in Australia